Events in the year 2022 in Papua New Guinea.

Incumbents 

 Monarch - Elizabeth II (until September 8); then Charles III

Federal government 

 Governor-General - Bob Dadae
 Prime Minister - James Marape

Provincial Governors 

 Central: Robert Agarobe
 Chimbu: Micheal Dua Bogai
 East New Britain: Michael Marum
 East Sepik: Allan Bird
 Enga: Peter Ipatas
 Gulf: Chris Haiveta
 Hela: Philip Undialu
 Jikawa: William Tongamp
 Madang: Peter Yama
 Manus: Charlie Benjamin
 Milne Bay: Sir John Luke Crittin, KBE
 Morobe: Ginson Saonu
 New Ireland: Julius Chan
 Oro: Gary Juffa
 Sandaun: Tony Wouwou
 Southern Highlands: William Powl
 West New Britain: Sasindran Muthuvel
 Western: Taboi Awe Yoto
 Western Highlands: Paias Wingti

Events 

 6 February – Prime Minister James Marape tests positive for COVID-19 and returns home after attending the 2022 Winter Olympics opening ceremony.
 13 April – A 6.3 magnitude earthquake hits the Papua New Guinean island of New Britain.
 4 July – 2022 Papua New Guinean general election: Papua New Guineans go to the polls to elect their new government in a heavily guarded election.
 22 July – Prime Minister James Marape's Pangu Pati wins the general election.
 10 August – James Marape is re-elected unopposed as Prime Minister by the Parliament after his party Pangu Pati won the general election in July.
 8 September – Accession of Charles III as King of Papua New Guinea following the death of Queen Elizabeth II.
 11 September – 2022 Papua New Guinea earthquake: At least eight people are killed and 24 others are injured after a magnitude 7.6 earthquake strikes Morobe Province, Papua New Guinea.
 13 September – Charles III is officially proclaimed King of Papua New Guinea at National Parliament House, Port Moresby.
 19 September – A national holiday is observed to mourn the passing of Elizabeth II, Queen of Papua New Guinea.
 19 September – Papua New Guinean representatives attend the funeral of Queen Elizabeth II in London.

Deaths 

 3 January – Tu'u Maori, 33, rugby league player (national team)
 3 March – William Samb, politician, MP (since 2015)
 11 May – Sam Basil, 52, politician, deputy prime minister (since 2020), MP (since 2007), and minister of finance (2019)
 9 June – Chris Nangoi, politician, MP (since 2017)
 21 June – Sir Peter Barter, 82,  businessman and politician, governor of Madang Province (1997–2002)
 8 September – Elizabeth II, 96, Queen of Papua New Guinea since 1975, affectionately known as Missis Kwin

References 

2020s in Papua New Guinea
2022 in Oceania
Years of the 21st century in Papua New Guinea
2022 in Papua New Guinea